Creaserinus danielae, the speckled burrowing crayfish, is a species of crayfish in the family Cambaridae. It is found in Mississippi, Alabama, Louisiana, and Florida.

The IUCN conservation status of Creaserinus danielae is "NT", near threatened. The species may be considered threatened in the near future. The IUCN status was reviewed in 2010.

References

Further reading

 
 
 

Cambaridae
Crustaceans described in 1975
Taxa named by Horton H. Hobbs Jr.